The 2018–19 South Dakota State Jackrabbits men's basketball team represents South Dakota State University during the 2018–19 NCAA Division I men's basketball season. The Jackrabbits, led by third-year head coach T. J. Otzelberger, play their home games at Frost Arena in Brookings, South Dakota as members of the Summit League. They finished the season 24–9, 14–2 in Summit League play to win the regular season championship. They lost in the quarterfinals of the Summit League tournament to Western Illinois. As a regular season league champion who failed to win their league tournament, they received an automatic bid to the National Invitation Tournament where they lost in the first round to Texas.

Previous season 
The Jackrabbits finished the season 28–7, 13–1 in Summit League play to win the Summit League regular season championship. In the Summit League tournament, they defeated Western Illinois, North Dakota State, and South Dakota to become Summit League Tournament champions. They received the Summit League's automatic bid to the NCAA tournament where they lost in the first round to Ohio State.

Roster

Schedule and results

|-
!colspan=9 style=| Exhibition

|-
!colspan=9 style=| Non-conference regular season 

|-
!colspan=9 style=| Summit League regular season

|-
!colspan=9 style=| Summit League tournament

|-
!colspan=9 style=| National Invitational tournament

Source

References

South Dakota State Jackrabbits men's basketball seasons
South Dakota State
South Dakota State Jackrabbits men's basketball
South Dakota State Jackrabbits men's basketball
South Dakota State